Morimus asper is a species of beetle in family Cerambycidae.

Etymology
The genus name "Morimus" derives from the Greek word "μόριμος" or "mórimos", meaning "destined to die", while the Latin species name "asper" (meaning "rough") refers to the surface of the elytra.

Subspecies
Morimus asper asper (Sulzer, 1767) 
Morimus asper funereus Mulsant, 1863
Morimus asper ganglbaueri Reitter, 1884
Morimus asper verecundus (Faldermann, 1836)

Description
This large and massive longhorn beetle has a black, elongated and oval body with very short, gray-brown hair and elytra are grainy over the entire surface. Males have more developed antennae. The subspecies Morimus asper funereus has gray-blue elytra with dark spots. The larvae are polyphagous, feeding mainly on deciduous and coniferous trees.

Adults can be found from March to October. They feed on bark, leaves and stems. Usually they hide during the day. Mating and oviposition take places mainly in the evening and at night, when they are active. Fights between the males with severe damages are common.

Distribution
This species is widespread in SW, S and SE Europe (Albania, Armenia, Azerbaijan, Bosnia and Herzegovina, Bulgaria, Corsica, Croatia, France, Georgia, Greece, Iran, Italy, Montenegro, Romania, Russia, Sardinia, Sicily, Spain, Switzerland, Turkey, Belarus and Ukraine), and Turkmenistan.

References
 Biolib
 Fauna Europaea
 Worldwide Cerambycoidea Photo Gallery
 Müller, Josef 1949: "I Coleotteri della Venezia Giulia. Catalogo ragionato, Vol. II: Coleoptera Phytophaga" Trieste Centro Sperimentale Agrario e Forestale publicazione n.4 1953,

Phrissomini